Momodu Mutairu (born September 2, 1976) is a former Nigerian football player.

Club statistics

National team statistics

References

External links

1976 births
Living people
Nigerian footballers
J2 League players
Japan Football League (1992–1998) players
Kawasaki Frontale players
Montedio Yamagata players
Association football forwards
Nigeria international footballers
1995 King Fahd Cup players